Pleurotus is a genus of fungi. , Index Fungorum lists 203 species in the genus.


A B C D E F G H I J K L M N O P Q R S T U V U W X Y Z

A
Pleurotus abieticola R.H.Petersen & K.W.Hughes 1997
Pleurotus abscondens (Peck) Sacc. 1887
Pleurotus achilleae Velen. 1927
Pleurotus agaves Dennis 1970
Pleurotus albidus (Berk.) Pegler 1983
Pleurotus albipes Beauseign. 1926
Pleurotus allochrous (Pers.) Sacc. & Traverso 1911
Pleurotus alocasiae Corner 1981
Pleurotus alveolus Velen. 1927
Pleurotus anas Overeem 1927
Pleurotus anastomosans Rick 1930
Pleurotus angustatus (Berk. & Broome) Sacc. 1887
Pleurotus arbuticola Pilát 1935
Pleurotus armeniacus Corner 1981
Pleurotus arrhenioides Henn. & E. Nyman 1899
Pleurotus aureovillosus Corner 1981
Pleurotus australis Sacc. 1891

B
Pleurotus badius (Murrill) Murrill 1916
Pleurotus bajocalifornicus Esteve-Rav., G. Moreno & N. Ayala 1993
Pleurotus berberidicola (Speg.) Sacc. 1891
Pleurotus bipindiensis Henn. 1901
Pleurotus bourdotii (Quél.) Sacc. & Traverso 1911

C

Pleurotus caespitosoterrestris (Henn.) Pilát 1935
Pleurotus caldwellii A.Mackay 1905
Pleurotus calyptratus (Lindblad ex Fr.) Sacc. 1887
Pleurotus camerunensis Henn. ex Sacc. & P. Syd. 1899
Pleurotus chrysorrhizus Corner 1981
Pleurotus cinerascens Velen. 1927
Pleurotus citrinopileatus Singer 1942
Pleurotus colae Massee 1912
Pleurotus colensoi Berk. ex Massee 1899
Pleurotus columbinus Quél. 1881
Pleurotus compactus Herp. 1912
Pleurotus concha (Hoffm.) Sacc. & Traverso 1910
Pleurotus convivarum Dunal & Delile 1901
Pleurotus cornucopiae (Paulet) Rolland 1910
Pleurotus craspedius (Fr.) Gillet 1876
Pleurotus cretaceus Massee 1899
Pleurotus cucullatus (Bres.) Bres. 1920
Pleurotus cyatheae S.Ito & S.Imai 1939
Pleurotus cyatheicola Corner 1981
Pleurotus cystidifer Velen. 1927
Pleurotus cystidiosus O.K.Mill. 1969 (edible)

D

Pleurotus decipiens Corner 1981
Pleurotus diabasicus Velen. 1920
Pleurotus diffractus Pilát 1941
Pleurotus djamor (Rumph. ex Fr.) Boedijn 1959
Pleurotus dracaenae Torrend 1909
Pleurotus dryinus (Pers.) P.Kumm. 1871

E

Pleurotus elegantissimus Speg. 1922
Pleurotus eleuterophyllus (Lév.) Sacc. & Trotter 1912
Pleurotus eous (Berk.) Sacc. 1887
Pleurotus epilobii Velen. 1930
Pleurotus eremita Maire 1931
Pleurotus eryngii (DC.) Quél. 1872
Pleurotus eugeniae (Earle) Sacc. & Traverso 1911
Pleurotus euosmus (Berk.) Sacc. 1887
 Pleurotus excavatus Sacc. 1887

F
Pleurotus fagineus Velen. 1927
Pleurotus favoloides Singer 1989
Pleurotus ferulaginis Zervakis, Venturella & Cattarossi 2014
Pleurotus flabellatus Sacc. 1887
Pleurotus flexilis S.T. Chang & X.L. Mao 1995
Pleurotus floridanus Singer 1948
Pleurotus fuligineocinereus (Britzelm.) Sacc. & Trotter 1912
Pleurotus fuscosquamulosus D.A.Reid & Eicker 1998

G
Pleurotus geesterani Singer 1962
Pleurotus gelatinosus Petch 1924
Pleurotus giganteus (Berk.) Karun. & K.D.Hyde 2011
Pleurotus guaraniticus (Berk.) Karun. & K.D.Hyde 2011
Pleurotus gussonei (Scalia) Bres. 1920
Pleurotus gypseus Velen. 1920

H
Pleurotus herbarum Velen. 1927
Pleurotus heteropus (Speg.) Speg. 1887
Pleurotus hollandianus Sumst. 1906
Pleurotus hortensis Velen. 1926
Pleurotus hyacinthus Corner 1981
Pleurotus hygrophanus (Earle) Sacc. & Traverso 1911

I
Pleurotus ilgazicus Pilát 1932
Pleurotus imbricatus (Earle) Sacc. & Traverso 1911
Pleurotus immersus Velen. 1939
Pleurotus importatus Henn. 1897
Pleurotus incarnatus Hongo 1973
Pleurotus inconspicuus Massee 1892
Pleurotus inornatus Speg. 1919
Pleurotus insidiosus (Sacc.) Y.S.Chang & Kantvilas 1993

J
Pleurotus juniperi Velen. 1927

K
Pleurotus kabulensis (Singer) Batyrova 1985
Pleurotus kotlabae Pilát 1953
Pleurotus kudrnae Velen. 1927

L
Pleurotus lagotis (Berk. & M.A. Curtis) Sacc. 1887
Pleurotus lampas (Berk.) Sacc. 1887
Pleurotus lampyrinus Pat. 1915
Pleurotus langei Pilát 1935
Pleurotus laricinus Velen. 1947
Pleurotus lazoi Donoso 1981
Pleurotus lichenicola Speg. 1889
Pleurotus lilaceilentus Corner 1981
Pleurotus lindquistii Singer 1960
Pleurotus lobatus Henn. & E.Nyman 1899
Pleurotus luctuosus Corner 1981
Pleurotus luminosus Beeli 1922
Pleurotus luteoalbus Beeli 1928
Pleurotus luteosaturatus (Malençon) P.-A.Moreau 2009

M
Pleurotus macilentus Massee 1901
Pleurotus magnificus Rick 1906
Pleurotus malleeanus Cleland 1933
Pleurotus membranaceus Massee 1901
Pleurotus mexicanus Guzmán 1974
Pleurotus meyeri-herrmannii Henn. 1900
Pleurotus michailowskojensis (Henn.) Pilát 1935
Pleurotus microleucus Singer 1978
Pleurotus microspermus Speg. 1889
Pleurotus minor Sosin 1960
Pleurotus minutoniger Lloyd 1925
Pleurotus musae Corner 1981
Pleurotus mutabilis Killerm. 1933

N

Pleurotus neapolitanus (Pers.) Singer 1943
Pleurotus nebrodensis (Inzenga) Quél. 1886
Pleurotus nemecii Pilát 1932
Pleurotus nepalensis Corner 1955
Pleurotus nitidus Har. Takah. & Taneyama 2016
Pleurotus novae-zelandiae (Berk.) Sacc. 1887

O

Pleurotus olivascens Corner 1981
Pleurotus omnivagus Corner 1981
Pleurotus opuntiae (Durieu & Lév.) Sacc. 1887
Pleurotus oregonensis(Murrill) Murrill 1912
Pleurotus orizabensis (Murrill) Sacc. & Trotter 1925
Pleurotus ostreatoroseus Singer 1961
Pleurotus ostreatus (Jacq.) P.Kumm. 1871

P

Pleurotus palmicola Beeli 1938
Pleurotus parsonsiae G.Stev. 1964
Pleurotus penangensis Corner 1981
Pleurotus pinsitiformis Pilát 1935
Pleurotus platypus Sacc. 1891
Pleurotus polyphemus (Cooke & Massee) Sacc. 1891
Pleurotus pometi (Fr.) Quél. 1872
Pleurotus pop-ivanensis Pilát 1935
Pleurotus populinus O.Hilber & O.K.Mill. 1993
Pleurotus populneus Velen. 1931
Pleurotus problematicus Corner 1981
Pleurotus proselyta E.H.L.Krause 1928
Pleurotus pseudosepticus Hruby 1930
Pleurotus pseudotremens Pilát 1935
Pleurotus pubescens Peck 1891
Pleurotus pulchellus S.Imai 1939
Pleurotus pulmonarius (Fr.) Quél. 1872
Pleurotus purpureo-olivaceus (G.Stev.) Segedin, P.K.Buchanan & J.P.Wilkie 1995
Pleurotus pusillus Speg. 1909
Pleurotus puttemansii Henn. 1908

R
Pleurotus radicosus Pat. 1917
Pleurotus ramosii Bres. 1926
Pleurotus resinaceus Bres. 1920
Pleurotus rickii Bres. 1920
Pleurotus romellianus Pilát 1935
Pleurotus rosarum Velen. 1927
Pleurotus rubi Velen. 1939

S
Pleurotus sambucinus Velen. 1920
Pleurotus samoensis Henn. 1896
Pleurotus sarasinii Henn. 1899
Pleurotus schwabeanus Henn. 1897
Pleurotus serotinoides (Peck) Sacc. 1887
Pleurotus similis Peck 1901
Pleurotus smithii Guzmán 1975
Pleurotus soyauxii Henn. 1891
Pleurotus spadiceus P.Karst. 1904
Pleurotus squamuliformis Velen. 1939
Pleurotus staringii Oudem. 1881
Pleurotus stella Pat. 1915
Pleurotus suballiaceus (Murrill) Murrill 1943
Pleurotus subareolatus Peck 1887
Pleurotus subbarbatulus (Murrill) Sacc. & Trotter 1925
Pleurotus subglaber (Lloyd) Singer 1951
Pleurotus subhaedinus (Murrill) Murrill 1916
Pleurotus submembranaceus (Berk.) Pegler 1988
Pleurotus submitis Speg. 1889
Pleurotus submutilus Speg. 1889
Pleurotus subostreatus Cleland & Cheel 1919
Pleurotus subsapidus Murrill 1912
Pleurotus subsepticus Henn. 1908
Pleurotus subulatus Henn. & E.Nyman 1900
Pleurotus subviolaceus Corner 1981
Pleurotus sulciceps (Cooke & Massee) Sacc. 1891
Pleurotus sutherlandii Singer 1952

T
Pleurotus tahitensis Pat. 1906
Pleurotus terrestris Peck 1907
Pleurotus thuidii Velen. 1927
Pleurotus tjibodensis Henn. 1900
Pleurotus togoensis Henn. 1897
Pleurotus tomentosulus (Peck) Sacc. 1891
Pleurotus tremelliformis (Murrill) Murrill 1916
Pleurotus tuber-regium (Fr.) Singer 1951
Pleurotus tuoliensis (C.J. Mou) M.R. Zhao & Jin X. Zhang 2016

U
Pleurotus umbonatus Peck 1905

V
Pleurotus velatus Segedin, P.K.Buchanan & J.P.Wilkie 1995
Pleurotus venosus Killerm. 1933
Pleurotus viaticus Velen. 1920
Pleurotus violaceocinerascens Henn. 1901
Pleurotus viscidulus (Berk. & Broome) Cleland 1934
Pleurotus viscidus Harmaja 1978
Pleurotus viticola (Murrill) Murrill 1940

Y
Pleurotus yuccae Maire 1919

Z
Pleurotus zimmermannii (Eichelb.) Sacc. & Trotter 1912

References

Pleurotus
Pleurotaceae